Shamima Begum (born 25 August 1999) is a British-born woman who entered Syria to join the terror group Islamic State of Iraq and the Levant (ISIL) at the age of 15. She was a student at Bethnal Green Academy in London when she and two schoolmates – who became known as the Bethnal Green trio – travelled to Syria in February 2015. Begum married a fellow ISIL member 10 days after her arrival and had three children who all died young. The Daily Telegraph reported that Begum had developed a reputation as an enforcer amongst other members of ISIL and had tried to recruit other young women to join the group.

In February 2019, Begum was discovered alive at the Al-Hawl refugee camp in Northern Syria by war correspondent Anthony Loyd. The following day, British Home Secretary, Sajid Javid, revoked her British citizenship. The British government believed that Begum held dual citizenship due to her Bangladeshi parents but this has been contested by the Government of Bangladesh.

Javid stated that Begum would never be allowed to return to the United Kingdom. In July 2020, the Court of Appeal ruled that Begum should be permitted to return to the UK in order to fairly contest the Home Secretary’s decision by instructing lawyers properly. This ruling was appealed to the Supreme Court of the United Kingdom which, on 26 February 2021, ruled unanimously against her, reversing the decision of the Court of Appeal and preventing her return.

In February 2023, the Special Immigration Appeals Commission further ruled that Javid's decision to revoke Begum's British citizenship had been lawful, on grounds of national security.

Background 

Begum was born in England to immigrant parents of Bangladeshi origin and citizenship. She was raised as a Muslim in the Bethnal Green area of Tower Hamlets in East London, where she received her secondary education at the Bethnal Green Academy.

Travel to Syria and ISIL membership

Travel to Syria 
Together with her friends Amira Abase and Kadiza Sultana, she left the UK in February 2015, at age 15. They travelled via Turkey to join the Islamic State of Iraq and the Levant in Syria.

Shortly after her departure, Begum's sister expressed hope that she and her school friends had travelled to ISIL territory only to bring back their friend Sharmeena Begum (no relation), who had travelled there in 2014.

Education secretary Nicky Morgan said in February 2015 that everyone hoped and prayed for the safe return of the three girls to the UK.

Activities in Syria 
Ten days after arriving in Syria, Begum married Dutch-born Yago Riedijk, a convert to Islam who had arrived in Syria in October 2014. This marriage may not be recognised under Dutch law since she was underage at that time. She gave birth to three children, all of whom died young; her youngest child was born in a refugee camp in February 2019 and, by March 2019, had died of a lung infection.

The Daily Telegraph reported that Begum had been an "enforcer" in ISIL's "morality police", and had tried to recruit other young women to join the jihadist group. The report said that she was allowed to carry a Kalashnikov rifle and earned a reputation as a strict enforcer of ISIL's laws, such as dress codes for women. An anti-ISIL activist was also reported by the Telegraph as saying that there were allegations of Begum stitching suicide bombs into explosive vests so they could not be removed without detonating.

Role of Canadian intelligence 
In 2022, investigative journalist Josh Baker retraced her route through Turkey and uncovered a vast ISIS people-smuggling network that facilitated Begum's travel to Syria. He also received hundreds of pages of secret files on the smuggler that revealed the man at the heart of the network, Mohammed Rashed, was conducting an intelligence operation. A serving senior intelligence officer confirmed to Baker that Rashed was a Canadian asset. 

Canadian prime minister Justin Trudeau said: "Obviously we know we live in a particularly dangerous world, the fight against terrorism requires our intelligence services to continue to be flexible and to  be creative in their approaches but every step of the way they are bound by strict rules, by principles and values that Canadians hold dear… and we expect that those rights be followed. I know there are questions about certain incidents or operations of the past and we will ensure to follow up on those." 

Separately published in August 2022, Richard Kerbaj's book The Secret History of the Five Eyes claimed that Mohammed Rashed, who helped her travel to Syria, was passing information to Canadian intelligence, which was known to Metropolitan Police. This link was not acknowledged by British or Canadian authorities. The Canadian intelligence was using Rashed for information on the Islamic State, allowing him to help people to travel to Syria to work for the Islamic State. Kerbaj said that he interviewed many Canadian intelligence officers, which confirmed the timeline of events.

Intended return

Media appearance 
In February 2019, The Times war correspondent Anthony Loyd found Begum at the al-Hawl refugee camp in Northern Syria. He reported her as saying that she wanted to return to the UK to raise her child, but did not regret her decision to join ISIL.  She said she had been unfazed by seeing the head of a beheaded man as he was "an enemy of Islam", but believed that ISIL did not deserve victory because of their corruption and oppression. 

When asked if she would be extracted from Syria, Security Minister Ben Wallace said, "I'm not putting at risk British people's lives to go and look for terrorists or former terrorists in a failed state." Three days after Loyd found her, Begum gave birth to a boy.

Begum was interviewed by BBC correspondent Quentin Sommerville on 18 February 2019. During the interview, Begum asked for the U.K.'s forgiveness and claimed that she still supported "some British values". She said she had been partly inspired to join ISIL by videos of fighters beheading hostages and also of "the good life" under the group. When asked about the Manchester Arena bombing, she said she was shocked and didn't "know about the kids", then said it was wrong to kill innocent people, but that ISIL considered it justified as retaliation for the coalition bombing of ISIL-held areas. When questioned about rape, enslavement and murder of Yazidi women, she claimed, "Shia do the same in Iraq".

In 2021, Begum cooperated with investigative journalist Josh Baker and gave what she claims is her full account of what happened. It is investigated in the podcast The Shamima Begum Story as series 2 of I'm Not A Monster. She is also considered in a feature film of the same name.

Citizenship 
In 2019 UK Home Secretary Sajid Javid announced that he had made an order depriving Begum of British citizenship. Under international law the UK government could not deprive her of British citizenship if such deprivation would leave her stateless. However, the UK government contended that Begum was a dual national, also holding citizenship of Bangladesh, and was not therefore made stateless by the decision. The Government of Bangladesh stated that Begum did not currently hold Bangladeshi citizenship and, without it, would not be allowed to enter Bangladesh.

Under British law, Begum had the right to appeal against the Home Office's decision to revoke her UK citizenship. Javid's decision was criticised by Begum's immediate family members, but her brother-in-law Muhammad Rahman urged the public to support the government decision. He said: "The information they have is to the best of their ability and the British people should support it." Begum said that she might consider applying for Dutch citizenship.

In February 2019, her father Ahmed Ali said, "If she at least admitted she made a mistake then I would feel sorry for her and other people would feel sorry for her, but she does not accept her wrong." Begum reacted by stating that she regretted speaking to the media and said the UK is making an example out of her.

Begum's lawyer claimed on 1 March that Begum and her son were moved from a Syrian refugee camp and relocated to another after threats against her were made.

On 3 March, Yago Riedijk, her husband, a member of ISIL, was interviewed by the BBC in a Kurdish detention centre in Syria. He said that he wished to return to the Netherlands with Begum. The Dutch government stated that they were not going to repatriate him.

On 8 March, it was reported that Syrian Democratic Forces had said that Begum's son Jarrah, whose imminent birth had apparently motivated her desire to return to the UK, had died in hospital the previous day. The cause of death was medically certified as pneumonia. Shadow Home Secretary Diane Abbott and human rights lawyer Clive Stafford Smith criticised the UK government's decision to block Begum's return to the UK.

A government spokesman said that, "The death of any child is tragic and deeply distressing for the family". Foreign Secretary Jeremy Hunt reiterated the position stated by Ben Wallace concerning risks to operatives who might be sent to recover her. He said "Shamima knew when she made the decision to join Daesh, she was going into a country where there was no embassy, there was no consular assistance, and I'm afraid those decisions, awful though it is, they do have consequences". He said that the Foreign Office and the Department for International Development were trying to rescue ISIL brides and that the decisions to deprive individuals of UK citizenship were based on evidence.

It was reported in August 2022 that Begum’s lawyer claims the British authorities knew that Begum was helped to travel to Syria to join the Islamic State by a Canadian intelligence agent, as claimed by Richard Kerbaj in his book The Secret History of the Five Eyes, a factor that had not been brought to the attention of the Supreme Court. Tasnime Akunjee, lawyer for the Begum family, said he had obtained a hearing in November 2022 to challenge the removal of Begum's citizenship on the basis that as Home Secretary Sajid Javid had failed to consider that she was a victim of human trafficking.

On 22 February 2023, it was reported that the Special Immigration Appeals Commission (SIAC) had ruled that the revocation of her citizenship was lawful.

Legal case against the British Government

Making citizens stateless (without citizenship of any country) is unlawful under the British Nationality Act 1981, section 40 and is also contrary to the United Nations Convention on the Reduction of Statelessness, of which the UK is a signatory. Begum was born a British citizen under United Kingdom law as her father (despite having already left the UK) had indefinite leave to remain and so had the "settled in the United Kingdom" status that the British Nationality Act 1981 describes as being a satisfactory prerequisite to allow Begum to be born a British citizen. However, the Special Immigration Appeals Commission found that as a matter of Bangladeshi nationality law Begum also holds Bangladeshi citizenship through her parents, under section 5 of the Citizenship Act, 1951. 

In April 2019, it was reported that Begum had been granted legal aid to fight the revocation of her British citizenship. Hunt described the Legal Aid Agency's decision as "very uncomfortable", but said that the UK is "a country that believes that people with limited means should have access to the resources of the state if they want to challenge the decisions the state has made about them".

In May 2019, Bangladeshi foreign minister Abdul Momen repeated their position on Begum and added that if she entered Bangladesh she would face the death penalty due to the nation's "zero tolerance policy" towards terrorism.

In August 2019, the Metropolitan Police requested media organisations that had interviewed Begum—the BBC, ITN, Sky News and The Times—to surrender any unpublished material they may hold about Begum. They sought disclosure under the Terrorism Act 2000 in order to prepare a potential prosecution against Begum.

Her lawyer, Tasnime Akunjee, travelled to Kurdish-controlled Syria to meet Begum but was turned away.

In July 2020, the Court of Appeal ruled that Begum could return to the UK to contest the government's decision to rescind her British citizenship. It was unclear how she would return to the UK to plead her case, as the British government had previously stated that it would never let her return.

In February 2021, the Supreme Court of the United Kingdom in Begum v Home Secretary decided in favour of the Home Secretary on all grounds.

On 22 February 2023, the Special Immigration Appeals Commission rejected her appeal against revocation of her British citizenship, which effectively prohibits her from entering the United Kingdom. Begum's lawyers said they would appeal the decision.

See also 

United Kingdom and ISIL
Brides of ISIL
Jack Letts
Samantha Lewthwaite

References 

1999 births
Living people
2015 in the United Kingdom
2019 in the United Kingdom
English expatriates in Syria
English Islamists
English people of Bangladeshi descent
Islamic State of Iraq and the Levant and the United Kingdom
People from Bethnal Green
Refugees in Syria
People who lost British citizenship
2020 in the United Kingdom
2021 in the United Kingdom